Haji Mohammad Salim (born 10 May 1958) is a Bangladesh Awami League politician and the incumbent Jatiya Sangsad member representing the Dhaka-7 constituency since 2014.

Salim was convicted on a corruption case for amassing wealth illegally, filed by the Anti-Corruption Commission in 2007. He began serving his 10-year prison sentence in May 2022. On 17 January 2023, he was released from prison cell of Bangabandhu Sheikh Mujib Medical University (BSMMU) based on the bail order on 6 December 2022 issued by Appellate Division panel headed by Chief Justice Hasan Foez Siddique.

Early life 
Salim was born on 10 May 1958. He studied up to grade nine.

Career 
Salim was a Bangladesh Nationalist Party (BNP) ward councilor. He had left the party and joined Awami League as he had failed to secure their nomination for the 1996 national election. He won the election and was elected to parliament from Dhaka-8 (Lalbagh area) as an Awami League candidate. He served in the Treasury Bench of the Jatiya Sangsad. He owns Madina Group; Tiger brand cement is one of its products. His rival and BNP member of parliament, Nasiruddin Ahmed Pintu, was his protégé.

On 5 January 2014, Salim was elected to parliament as an independent candidate. The Daily Star described him as a "rebel Awami League" candidate. He was the joint secretary of Dhaka City unit of Awami League. He beat Mostafa Jalal Mohiuddin, the Awami League candidate in the election. In April 2014, he faced contempt of court charges after he obstructed a mobile court drive evicting illegal structures around Lalbagh Fort.

In 2015, Salim tried to contest the Dhaka South mayoral election but did not receive approval from his party. He extended his support to the Awami League candidate Sayeed Khokon.

In 2018, Salim was elected to the parliament from Dhaka-7 as a candidate of Awami League.

In December, Salim collected nomination forms from Awami League to contest Dhaka South Mayoral elections. He lost the nomination to Sheikh Fazle Noor Taposh, who went on to win the election.

Charges and convictions
In September 2007, The Anti-Corruption Commission (ACC) filed two corruption cases against Salim. In April 2008, a special court sentenced Selim to 10 years' imprisonment for amassing wealth illegally and another 3 years for concealing information in his wealth statement submitted to the ACC.  The judge also issued orders to confiscate all his ill-gotten assets worth Tk 270 million. The court also sentenced his wife, Gulshan Ara (d. 2020), to 3 years' imprisonment for abetting her husband. Salim filed an appeal with the High Court in October 2009 against the verdict. Following the appeal, in January 2011, the High Court acquitted him of the corruption case. The ACC then appealed against the HC verdict to the Appellate Division of the Supreme Court and in January 2015, it scrapped the High Court verdict and directed to hold a rehearing of Salim's appeal and to dispose of the appeal again. In March 2021, the High Court upheld the verdict to 10 years' imprisonment in the corruption case but acquitted him of the charge of concealing wealth information in which he was sentenced to 3 years' imprisonment. On 10 February 2022, the High Court upheld the lower court's judgement convicting and sentencing Salim to 10 years in prison. He was asked to surrender to the trial court in 30 days. On 22 May, he surrendered to the court and sought bail in the case but it was rejected and he was sent to the prison. A day later, he was taken to Bangabandhu Sheikh Mujib Medical University for treatment. On 6 June, the Supreme Court refused him to grant bail on the case.

On 25 March 2004, six cases were filed against Salim following clashes between Awami League and BNP activists.

In May 2009, Salim was acquitted in the murder case of Abdul Hannan, an activist of Bangladesh Jatiotabadi Jubo Dal, the youth front of BNP by Speedy Trial Tribunal-1. In July 2009, after Awami League came to power the government decided to withdraw 21 criminal cases against Salim. The government stated that the cases were filed those were "politically motivated" and meant for "harassment". He had a total of 120 cases against him.

In September 2011, the government of Bangladesh withdrew 105 cases against Salim. In February 2012, a case over assaulting police officers in 2004 was withdrawn by the government.

In February 2019, a number of buildings owned by him were demolished by Bangladesh Water Development Board for encroaching on riverbanks. His some other buildings were demolished by Bangladesh Inland Water Transport Authority; following its Chairman, Commodore Mohammad Mozammel Haque, got transferred to a different location.

Controversies
In February 2014, Jagannath University students organized protests demanding Salim return their dormitory that they accused him of illegally occupying. He denied the allegation and asked for evidence. He had allegedly occupied the Tibet Hall, demolished it, and built a market in its place.

On 8 June 2019, Salim's man demolished Jahaj Bari, an architecturally significant historical building in Old Dhaka, on the night of Eid al-Fitr. The demolition had been previously stopped following the filling of a General Diary by Taimur Islam of Urban Study Group.

Salim's son, Irfan Selim, was arrested after he was accused to physically assaulted a Bangladesh Navy lieutenant and his wife on 25 October 2020. Irfan was jailed for 1 year after illegal firearms and alcohol were recovered from his house.

References

Living people
1958 births
Awami League politicians
Independent politicians in Bangladesh
7th Jatiya Sangsad members
10th Jatiya Sangsad members
11th Jatiya Sangsad members
Bangladeshi politicians convicted of crimes
Bangladeshi male criminals
Prisoners and detainees of Bangladesh